This is a list of war crimes committed during World War II.

Axis powers 
The Axis powers (Nazi Germany, Fascist Italy, and Imperial Japan) were some of the most systematic perpetrators of war crimes in modern history. The factors which contributed to Axis war crimes included Nazi racial theories, the desire for "living space" which was used as a justification for the eradication of native populations, and militaristic indoctrination that encouraged the terrorization of conquered peoples and prisoners of war. The Holocaust, the German attack on the Soviet Union and the German occupation of much of Europe, the Japanese invasion and occupation of Manchuria, the Japanese invasion of China and the Japanese occupation of the Philippines all contributed to well over half of all of the civilian deaths in World War II as well as the conflicts that led up to the war. Even before post-war revelations of atrocities, Axis military forces were notorious for their brutal treatment of captured combatants.

Crimes perpetrated by Germany 

According to the Nuremberg Trials, there were four major categories of crimes alleged against the German political leadership, the ruling party NSDAP, the military high command, the paramilitary SS, the security services, the civil occupation authorities, as well as individual government officials (including members of the civil service or the diplomatic corps), soldiers or members of paramilitary formations, industrialists, bankers and media proprietors, each with individual events that made up the major charges. The crime of genocide was later raised to a separate, fifth category.

 Participation in a common plan of conspiracy for the accomplishment of crimes against peace
 Planning, initiating and waging wars of aggression and other crimes against peace
 Planning and executing a campaign of invasion of its European neighbours, as well as the conspiracy to violate the Treaty of Versailles and the Treaty of Saint-Germain through the remilitarisation of the Rhineland, and the annexations of Austria and Czechoslovakia.
 War crimes – atrocities against enemy combatants or conventional crimes committed by military units (see War crimes of the Wehrmacht), and include:
 Invasion of Poland without a formal declaration of war: During the period of 1 September – 25 October 1939 German forces in their military actions engaged in executions of Polish POWs, bombing hospitals, murdering civilians, shooting refugees, and executing wounded soldiers. The cautious estimates give a number of at least 16,000 murdered victims.
 Wawer massacre: the execution of 107 Polish civilians on the night of 26 to 27 December 1939 by the Nazi German occupiers of Wawer (near Warsaw), Poland. The execution was a response to the deaths of two German NCOs. 120 people were arrested and 114 were shot, of whom 7 survived.
 Pacification Operations in German occupied Poland: During the occupation of Poland by German Reich, Wehrmacht forces took part in several pacification actions in rural areas, that resulted in murder of at least 20,000 Polish villagers.
 Le Paradis massacre: In May 1940, British soldiers of the Royal Norfolk Regiment were captured by the SS and subsequently murdered. Fritz Knoechlein was tried, found guilty, and hanged for ordering the massacre.
 Wormhoudt massacre: In May 1940, British and French soldiers were captured by the SS and subsequently murdered. No one found guilty of the crime.
Normandy Massacres, a series of killings in which up to 156 Canadian prisoners of war were murdered by soldiers of the 12th SS Panzer Division (Hitler Youth) during the Battle of Normandy
Ardenne Abbey massacre, one of the Normandy massacres; June 1944 Canadian soldiers captured by the SS and murdered by 12th SS Panzer Division Hitlerjugend. SS General Kurt Meyer (Panzermeyer) sentenced to be shot 1946; sentence commuted; released 1954
 Malmedy massacre: In December 1944, United States POWs captured by Kampfgruppe Peiper were murdered outside Malmedy, Belgium
 Gardelegen (war crime): The German SS forced 1,016 slave labourers who were part of transports evacuated from several sub-camps of Mittelbau-Dora Concentration Camp and from the sub-camp Hannover-Stöcken of Neuengamme Concentration Camp into a large barn which was then lit on fire. Most of the prisoners were burned alive; some were shot trying to escape.
 Marzabotto massacre: The German SS killing of at least 770 civilians of Marzabotto as a collective punishment for their support of Italian partisans and the Italian resistance movement
 Sant'Anna di Stazzema massacre: A massacre was committed in the hill village of Sant'Anna di Stazzema in Tuscany, Italy, in the course of an operation against the Italian resistance movement during the Italian Campaign of World War II.  560 local villagers and refugees were murdered and their bodies burnt in a scorched earth policy action by the Nazis.
 Cefalonia Massacre: The mass execution of the men of the Italian 33rd Acqui Infantry Division by the Germans on the island of Cephalonia, Greece was committed after the Italian armistice.
 Oradour-sur-Glane massacre: On 10 June 1944, the village of Oradour-sur-Glane in Haute-Vienne in then Nazi occupied France was destroyed.  642 of its inhabitants, including women and children, were massacred by a Waffen-SS company.
 Massacre of Kalavryta: The extermination of the male population and the total destruction of the town of Kalavryta, in Greece, by German occupying forces during World War II, was committed on 13 December 1943.
 Distomo massacre: This attack was perpetrated by members of the Waffen-SS in the village of Distomo, Greece, during the Axis occupation of Greece during World War II.
 Kragujevac massacre:  This was a Nazi war crime and partially an act of genocide in which Serbs, Jews and Roma men and boys in Kragujevac, Serbia, were murdered by German Wehrmacht soldiers on 20 and 21 October 1941.
 The crimes during the 1944 Warsaw uprising such as the Wola massacre or the Ochota massacre 
 The planned destruction of Warsaw (levelling of the whole city) following the fall of the Warsaw Uprising 
 The annihilation of the Czech village of Lidice was committed as an act of vengeance for the assassination of Reinhard Heydrich
 The treatment of Soviet POWs throughout the war, who were not given the protections and guarantees of the Geneva Convention unlike other Allied prisoners was a war crime. Nazi crimes against Soviet POWs, resulted in some 3.3 million to 3.5 million deaths. This accounts for about 60% of all Soviet           POWs. 
 The Arnsberg Forest massacre, in which 3 mass killings of 208 slave labourers and Prisoners of war, mostly Russian and Polish, took place in March 1945.
 Unrestricted submarine warfare against merchant shipping was another war crime.
 Nazi looting of Poland
 Commando Order which stated that Allied combatants encountered during commando operations were to be executed immediately upon capture and without trial, even if they were properly uniformed, unarmed, or intending to surrender was a war crime.
 Commissar Order:  An order stating that Soviet political commissars found among captured troops were to be executed immediately was a war crime.
 Nacht und Nebel directive, targeting political activists and resistance "helpers" in the territories occupied by Nazi Germany during the World War II, who were to be imprisoned, murdered, or made to disappear, while the family and the population remained uncertain as to the fate or whereabouts of alleged offender against the Nazi German occupation power
 Vinkt massacre: In May 1940 at least 86 civilians in Vinkt were killed by the German Wehrmacht.
 Heusden: A town hall was massacred in November 1944.
 German war crimes during the Battle of Moscow are another example.
 Crimes against humanity – crimes committed well away from the lines of battle and unconnected directly to ongoing military activity, distinct from war crimes
 The employment of concentration camps across Europe, including Dachau, Sachsenhausen, Mauthausen, Bergen-Belsen, Natzweiler-Struthof, Esterwegen, Stutthof, Potulice and Auschwitz I which held POWs and political prisoners in inhuman conditions, and transported Jews and Roma to extermination camps
 Nazi human experiments
 The Generalplan Ost, including the Pabst Plan:
 Łapankas or "Catching Roundups", – Nazi roundups of Poles, usually completely random, in the major cities for slave labour or for keeping as hostages, summarily executed in highly publicized terror reprisals with an intended punintive and deterring effect, following each of attempted or completed ambush attacks against German forces as well as assassinations of German occupation officials or their prominent local collaborators 
 The Operation Tannenberg based on the Special Prosecution Book-Poland, the AB Action, the Intelligenzaktion (including Intelligenzaktion Pommern and Sonderaktion Krakau), resulting in numerous summary murders such as the Bydgoszcz Valley of Death, the massacres in Piaśnica, the Forest of Szpęgawsk massacre, the Rudzki Most massacre, the Palmiry massacre, and the massacres following the German invasion of the Soviet Union: the massacre of Lwów professors, the Ponary massacre and the Czarny Las massacre; any Nazi actions in Poland meant to mass murder the Polish intelligentsia and other potential leaders of resistance. 
 Expulsion of Poles by Nazi Germany, including expulsions from the Polish areas annexed by Nazi Germany, the Action Saybusch, the ethnic cleansing of Zamojszczyzna, and the planned settlement of Wehrbauers.
 Nur für Deutsche apartheid policy in occupied Poland and the so-called Polish decrees concerning the Polish labourers in Germany 
 The widespread use of slave labour and the forced/unfree labour by the Nazi regime, including forced labor in Nazi concentration camps
 Nazi destruction of Polish culture and suppression of Polish higher education institutions
 The Hunger Plan
 Aktion T4, the Nazi "euthanasia" program, under which an estimated 200,000 mentally or physically handicapped people were murdered.
 The persecution of homosexuals in Nazi Germany, including their extermination
The crime of genocide, initially classified as a type of crimes against humanity, later defined as a distinct type of crime 
 The Final Solution, including the Holocaust, the genocide of the European Jews, as well as the Porajmos, the genocide of the Romany peoples of Europe by the Nazis including:
 The construction and use of Vernichtungslagern (extermination camps) to commit genocide, most prominently at Auschwitz-Birkenau, Treblinka, Majdanek, Bełżec, Sobibór, and Chełmno
 Death marches of prisoners, particularly in the last months of the war when the aforementioned camps were being overrun by the Allies
 the use of extermination camp prisoners as slaves, with the intent of extermination through labour
 The establishment of Jewish Ghettos in Eastern Europe intended to isolate Jewish communities for deportation and subsequent extermination  
 The use of SS Einsatzgruppen, mobile extermination squads, to exterminate Jews and anti-nazi "partisans"
 Babi Yar a series of massacres in Kiev, the most notorious and the best documented of these massacres took place on 29–30 September 1941, wherein 33,771 Jews were killed in a single operation. The decision to kill all the Jews in Kiev was made by the military governor, Major-General Kurt Eberhard, the Police Commander for Army Group South, SS-Obergruppenführer Friedrich Jeckeln, and the Einsatzgruppe C Commander Otto Rasch. It was carried out by Sonderkommando 4a soldiers, along with the aid of the SD and SS Police Battalions backed by the local police.
 Rumbula a collective term for incidents on two non-consecutive days (30 November and 8 December 1941) in which about 25,000 Jews were killed in or on the way to Rumbula forest near Riga, Latvia, during the Holocaust
 Ninth Fort By the order of SS-Standartenführer Karl Jäger and SS-Rottenführer Helmut Rauca, the Sonderkommando under the leadership of SS-Obersturmführer Joachim Hamann, and 8 to 10 men from Einsatzkommando 3, in collaboration with Lithuanian partisans, murdered 2,007 Jewish men, 2,920 women, and 4,273 children in a single day at the Ninth Fort, Kaunas, Lithuania.
 Simferopol Germans perpetrated one of the largest war-time massacres in Simferopol, killing in total over 22,000 locals—mostly Jews, Russians, Krymchaks, and Gypsies. On one occasion, starting 9 December 1941, the Einsatzgruppen D under Otto Ohlendorf's command killed an estimated 14,300 Simferopol residents, most of them being Jews.
 The massacre of 100,000 Jews and Poles at Paneriai 
 Nikolaev massacre, which resulted in the deaths of 35,782 Soviet citizens, most of whom were Jews.
 The suppression of the 1943 Warsaw Ghetto uprising which erupted when the SS came to clear the Jewish ghetto and send all of the occupants to extermination camps
 Izieu Massacre Izieu was the site of a Jewish orphanage during the Second World War. On 6 April 1944, three vehicles pulled up in front of the orphanage. The Gestapo, under the direction of the 'Butcher of Lyon' Klaus Barbie, entered the orphanage and forcibly removed the forty-four children and their seven supervisors, throwing the crying and terrified children on to the trucks. Following the raid on their home in Izieu, the children were shipped directly to the "collection center" in Drancy, then put on the first available train towards the concentration camps in the East.
 The genocidal kidnapping of children by Nazi Germany for programmes such as Lebensborn 

At least 10 million, and perhaps over 20 million perished directly and indirectly due to the commission of crimes against humanity and war crimes by Hitler's regime, of which the Holocaust lives on in particular infamy, for its particularly cruel nature and scope, and the industrialised nature of the genocide of Jewish citizens of states invaded or controlled by the Nazi regime. At least 5.9 million Jews were murdered by the Nazis, or 66 to 78% of Europe's Jewish population, although a complete count may never be known. Though much of Continental Europe suffered under the Nazi occupation, Poland, in particular, was the state most devastated by these crimes, with 90% of its Jews as well as many ethnic Poles slaughtered by the Nazis and their affiliates. After the war, from 1945 to 1949, the Nazi regime was put on trial in two tribunals in Nuremberg, Germany by the victorious Allied powers.

The first tribunal indicted 24 major Nazi war criminals, and resulted in 19 convictions (of which 12 led to death sentences) and 3 acquittals, 2 of the accused died before a verdict was rendered, at least one of which by killing himself with cyanide. The second tribunal indicted 185 members of the military, economic, and political leadership of Nazi Germany, of which 142 were convicted and 35 were acquitted. In subsequent decades, approximately 20 additional war criminals who escaped capture in the immediate aftermath of World War II were tried in West Germany and Israel. In Germany and many other European nations, the Nazi Party and denial of the Holocaust is outlawed.

Crimes perpetrated by Hungary

Crimes perpetrated by Italy 

 Invasion of Abyssinia: Waging a war of aggression for territorial aggrandisement, war crimes, use of poisons as weapons, crimes against humanity; in violation of the Kellogg-Briand Pact, and the customary law of nations, Italy invaded the Kingdom of Abyssinia in 1936 without cause cognisable by the law of nations, and waged a war of annihilation against Ethiopian resistance, using poisons against military forces and civilian persons alike, not giving quarter to POWs who had surrendered, and massacring civilians, including the killing of 19,000-30,000 civilians in the 1937 Yekatit 12 massacre.
 Invasion of Albania: Waging a war of aggression for territorial aggrandisement; Italy invaded the Kingdom of Albania in 1939 without cause cognisable by the law of nations in a brief but bloody affair that saw King Zog deposed and an Italian proconsul installed in his place. Italy subsequently acted as the suzerain of Albania until its ultimate liberation later in World War II.
 Invasion of Yugoslavia: Aerial bombardment of civilian population; internment of tens of thousands of civilians in concentration camps (Rab: 3,500 – 4,641 killed, Gonars: over 500 killed, Molat: 1,000 killed).
 "Circular 3C" policy, implemented by Mario Roatta, which included the tactics of "summary executions, hostage-taking, reprisals, internments and the burning of houses and villages." 
 Massacres of civilians, such as in Podhum.
 Italian invasion and occupation of Greece: Domenikon massacre. 
 No one has been brought to trial for war crimes, although in 1950 the former Italian defence minister was convicted for collaboration with Nazi Germany.

Crimes perpetrated by the (first) Slovak Republic (1939–1945) 
 deportation of around 70,000 Slovak Jews into German Nazi concentration camps
 annihilation of 60 villages and their inhabitants
 deportation of Slovak Jews, Roma and political opponents into Slovak forced labour camps in Sereď, and Nováky
 brought to trial and sentenced to death: Jozef Tiso, Ferdinand Ďurčanský (he fled), Vojtech Tuka and 14 others

Crimes perpetrated by Japan 

This section includes war crimes which were committed from 7 December 1941 when the United States was attacked by Imperial Japan and entered World War II. For war crimes which were committed before this date, specifically for war crimes which were committed during the Second Sino-Japanese War, please see the section above which is titled 1937–1945: Second Sino-Japanese War.

Crimes perpetrated by Romania

Crimes perpetrated by the Chetniks 
Chetnik ideology revolved around the notion of a Greater Serbia within the borders of Yugoslavia, to be created out of all territories in which Serbs were found, even if the numbers were small. A directive dated 20 December 1941, addressed to newly appointed commanders in Montenegro, Major Đorđije Lašić and Captain Pavle Đurišić, outlined, among other things, the cleansing of all non-Serb elements in order to create a Greater Serbia:

The Chetniks systemically massacred Muslims in villages that they captured. In late autumn of 1941 the Italians handed over the towns of Višegrad, Goražde, Foča and the surrounding areas, in south-east Bosnia to the Chetniks to run as a puppet administration and NDH forces were compelled by the Italians to withdraw from there. After the Chetniks gained control of Goražde on 29 November 1941, they began a massacre of Home Guard prisoners and NDH officials that became a systematic massacre of the local Muslim civilian population.

Several hundred Muslims were murdered and their bodies were left hanging in the town or thrown into the Drina river. On 5 December 1941, the Chetniks received the town of Foča from the Italians and proceeded to massacre around 500 Muslims. Additional massacres against the Muslims in the area of Foča took place in August 1942. In total, more than 2000 people were killed in Foča.

In early January, Chetniks entered Srebrenica and killed around 1000 Muslim civilians there and in nearby villages. Around the same time the Chetniks made their way to Višegrad where deaths were reportedly in the thousands. Massacres continued in the following months in the region. In the village of Žepa alone about three hundred were killed in late 1941. In early January, Chetniks massacred fifty-four Muslims in Čelebić and burned down the village. On 3 March, Chetniks burned forty-two Muslim villagers to death in Drakan.

In early January 1943, and again in early February, Montenegrin Chetnik units were ordered to carry out "cleansing actions" against Muslims, first in the Bijelo Polje county in Sandžak and then in February in the Čajniče county and part of Foča county in southeastern Bosnia, and in part of the Pljevlja county in Sandžak.

Pavle Đurišić, the officer in charge of these operations, reported to Mihailović, Chief of Staff of the Supreme Command, that on 10 January 1943: "thirty-three Muslim villages had been burned down, and 400 Muslim fighters (members of the Muslim self-protection militia supported by the Italians) and about 1,000 women and children had been killed, as against 14 Chetnik dead and 26 wounded".

In another report sent by Đurišić dated 13 February 1943, he reported that: "Chetniks killed about 1,200 Muslim fighters and about 8,000 old people, women, and children; Chetnik losses in the action were 22 killed and 32 wounded". He added that "during the operation the total destruction of the Muslim inhabitants was carried out regardless of sex and age". The total number of deaths caused by the anti-Muslim operations between January and February 1943 is estimated at 10,000. The casualty rate would have been higher had a great number of Muslims not already fled the area, most to Sarajevo, when the February action began. According to a statement from the Chetnik Supreme Command from 24 February 1943, these were countermeasures taken against Muslim aggressive activities; however, all circumstances show that these massacres were committed in accordance with implementing the directive of 20 December 1941.

Actions against the Croats were of a smaller scale but comparable in action. In early October 1942 in the village of Gata, where an estimated 100 people were killed and many homes burnt in reprisal taken for the destruction of roads in the area carried out on the Italians' account. That same month, formations under the command of Petar Baćović and Dobroslav Jevđević, who were participating in the Italian Operation Alfa in the area of Prozor, massacred over 500 Croats and Muslims and burnt numerous villages. Baćović noted that "Our Chetniks killed all men 15 years of age or older. ... Seventeen villages were burned to the ground." Mario Roatta, commander of the Italian Second Army, objected to these "massive slaughters" of noncombatant civilians and threatened to halt Italian aid to the Chetniks if they did not end.

Crimes perpetrated by the Ustashas 
The Ustaša intended to create an ethnically "pure" Greater Croatia, and they viewed those Serbs then living in Croatia, Bosnia and Herzegovina as the biggest obstacle to this goal. Ustasha ministers Mile Budak, Mirko Puk and Milovan Žanić declared in May 1941 that the goal of the new Ustasha policy was an ethnically pure Croatia. The strategy to achieve their goal was:

 One-third of the Serbs were to be killed
 One-third of the Serbs were to be expelled
 One-third of the Serbs were to be forcibly converted to Catholicism
 
The Independent State of Croatia government cooperated with Nazi Germany in the Holocaust and exercised their own version of the genocide against Serbs, as well as Jews and Gypsies (Roma) (aka "gypsies") inside its borders. State policy towards Serbs had first been declared in the words of Milovan Žanić, a minister of the NDH Legislative council, on 2 May 1941:

This country can only be a Croatian country, and there is no method we would hesitate to use in order to make it truly Croatian and cleanse it of Serbs, who have for centuries endangered us and who will endanger us again if they are given the opportunity. According to the Simon Wiesenthal Center (citing the Encyclopedia of the Holocaust), "Ustasa terrorists killed 500,000 Serbs, expelled 250,000 and forced 250,000 to convert to Roman Catholicism. They murdered thousands of Jews and Gypsies." The execution methods used by the Ustasha were particularly brutal and sadistic and often included torture, dismemberment or decapitation. A Gestapo report to Heinrich Himmler from 1942 stated, "The Ustaše committed their deeds in a bestial manner not only against males of conscript age but especially against helpless old people, women and children."

Numerous concentration camps were built in the NDH, most notably Jasenovac, the largest, where around 100,000 Serbs, Jews, Roma, as well as a number of Croatian political dissidents, died, mostly from torture and starvation. It was established in August 1941 and not dismantled until April 1945, shortly before the end of the war. The complex also included large grounds at Donja Gradina directly across the Sava River, the Jastrebarsko children's camp to the northwest, and the Stara Gradiška camp (Jasenovac V) for women and children to the southeast.

Unlike Nazi camps, most murders at Jasenovac were done manually using hammers, axes, knives and other implements. According to testimony, on the night of 29 August 1942, guards at the camp organised a competition to see who could slaughter the most inmates, with guard and former Franciscan priest Petar Brzica winning by cutting the throats of 1,360 inmates. A special knife called a "Srbosjek" (Serb-cutter) was designed for the slaughtering of prisoners. Prisoners were sometimes tied with barbed wire, then taken to a ramp near to the Sava River where weights were placed on the wires, their throats and stomachs slashed before their bodies were dumped into the river. After unsuccessful experiments with gas vans, camp commander Vjekoslav Luburić had a gas chamber built at Jasenovac V, where a considerable number of inmates were killed during a three-month experiment with sulfur dioxide and Zyklon B, but this method was abandoned due to poor construction. The Ustashe cremated living inmates as well as corpses. Other methods of torture and killing done included: inserting hot nails under finger nails, mutilating parts of the body including plucking out eyeballs, tightening chains around ones head until the skull fractured and the eyes popped and also, placing salt in open wounds. Women were subjected to rape and torture, including breast mutilation. Pregnant women had their wombs cut out.

An escape attempt on 22 April 1945 by 600 male inmates failed and only 84 male prisoners escaped successfully. The remainder and about 400 other prisoners were then murdered by Ustasha guards, despite the fact that they knew the war was ending with Germany's capitulation. All the female inmates from the women's camp (more than 700) had been massacred by the guards the previous day. The guards then destroyed the camp and everything associated with it was burned to the ground. Other concentration camps were the Đakovo camp, Gospić camp, Jadovno camp, Kruščica camp and the Lepoglava camp.

Ustasha militias and death squads also burnt villages and killed thousands of civilian Serbs in the country-side in sadistic ways with various weapons and tools. Men, women, children were hacked to death, thrown alive into pits and down ravines, or set on fire in churches. Some Serb villages near Srebrenica and Ozren were wholly massacred, while children were found impaled by stakes in villages between Vlasenica and Kladanj. The Glina massacres, where thousands of Serbs were killed, are among the more notable instances of Ustasha cruelty.

Ante Pavelić, leader of the Ustasha, fled to Argentina and Spain which gave him protection, and was never extradited to stand trial for his war crimes. Pavelić died on 28 December 1959 at the Hospital Alemán in Madrid, where the Roman Catholic church had helped him to gain asylum, at the age of 70 from gunshot wounds sustained in an earlier assassination attempt by Montenegrin Blagoje Jovović. Some other prominent Ustashe figures and their respective fates:

Andrija Artuković, Croatian Minister of Interior. Died in Croatian custody.
Mile Budak, Croatian politician and chief Ustashe ideologist. Tried and executed by Yugoslav authorities.
Petar Brzica, Franciscan friar who won a throat-cutting contest at Jasenovac. Post-war fate unknown.
Miroslav Filipović, camp commander and Franciscan friar notorious for his cruelty and sadism. Tried and executed by Yugoslav authorities. 
Slavko Kvaternik, Ustashe military commander-in-chief. Tried and executed by Yugoslav authorities.
Vjekoslav "Maks" Luburić, commander of the Ustaše Defence Brigades (Ustaška Odbrana) and Jasenovac camp. Murdered in Spain.
Dinko Šakić, Ustashe commander of Jasenovac. Fled to Argentina, extradited to Croatia for trial in 1998. Sentenced to 20 years and died in prison in 2008.

Most Ustashe fled the country following the war, mainly with the help of Father Krunoslav Draganović, secretary of the College of Sian Girolamo who helped Ustasha fugitives immigrate illegally to South America.

Crimes perpetrated by Ukrainian nationalists 
The Ukrainian OUN-B group, along with their military force – Ukrainian Insurgent Army(UPA) – are responsible for a genocide on the Polish population in Volhynia and Eastern Galicia. Starting in March 1943, with its peak in the summer 1943, as many as 80,000 -100,000. Although the main target were Poles, many Jews, Czechs and those Ukrainians unwilling to participate in the crimes, were massacred as well. Lacking good armament and ammunition, UPA members commonly used tools such as axes and pitchforks for the slaughter. As a result of these massacres, almost the entire non-Ukrainian population of Volhynia was either killed or forced to flee. However, the premix of this ethnic cleansing was the war of Polish partisan Homeland Army against Ukraine, in which Poland wanted to re-occupy Western Ukraine, treacherously captured in 1921. Homeland Army committed a genocide of Ukrainians during this conquest campaign, killed as many as 15000 mostly in near-border villages and practised unprecedented cruelty against UPA partisans.

UPA commanders responsible for the genocide:
 Roman Shukhevych – general of the Ukrainian Insurgent Army. As a leader of the UPA he was to be aware and to approve the project of ethnic cleansing in Volhynia and Eastern Galicia.
 Dmytro Klyachkivsky – colonel of the UPA. He gave the order "to wipe out an entire Polish male population between 16 and 60 years old" (according to the research of the Ukrainian historians, this citation may be falsified by the Soviet intelligence). Klyachkivsky is regarded as the main initiator of the massacres. 
 Mykola Lebed – one of the OUN leaders, and UPA fighter. By the National Archives, he is described as "Ukrainian fascist leader and suspected Nazi collaborator"
 Stepan Bandera – leader of the OUN-B. His view was to remove all Poles, who were hostile towards the OUN, and assimilate the rest of them. The role of the main architect of the massacres is often assigned to him. However, he was imprisoned in German concentration camp since 1941, so there is a strong suspicion, that he wasn't fully aware of events in Volhynia.

Allied powers

Crimes perpetrated by the Soviet Union

Crimes perpetrated by the United Kingdom

Crimes perpetrated by the United States

Crimes perpetrated by Canada

Crimes perpetrated by the Yugoslav Partisans

References

Bibliography 

Law-related lists
War crimes
 
Lists of World War II topics